Erechtites is a genus of flowering plants in the daisy family known commonly as fireweeds or burnweeds. They are native to the Americas and Australia, but some species are widely distributed weeds.

Description
Erechtites consists of annual or perennial herbs with large taproots and very often with a pungent odor. Leaves are usually ovate or lanceolate (sometimes pinnately lobed or pinnatifid). Flower heads may sometimes contain  as many as 100 yellow or white (rarely pink) disc florets but no ray florets.

Taxonomy and species
Some species in this genus are treated as members of Senecio by some authors, and several other species are considered variants of Erechtites hieraciifolius, so there may be as few as 5 distinct species in this genus.  In particular, not all authors agree on whether to include a dozen or so species native to Australia and New Zealand in Erechtites. 

Species

27 species are recognised by Plants of the World Online

Erechtites apargiifolius  - Australia
Erechtites atkinsoniae  - Australia
Erechtites bathurstianus  - Australia
Erechtites bukaensis  - Solomon Islands
Erechtites diversifolius  - New Zealand
Erechtites glabrescens  - Australia
Erechtites glomeratus  - Australia, New Zealand
Erechtites glossanthus  - Australia
Erechtites goyazensis  - South America
Erechtites gunnii  - Australia
Erechtites hieraciifolius  - North America, South America, West Indies; introduced in Europe and Asia
Erechtites hispidulus  - Australia
Erechtites ignobilis  - South America
Erechtites kermadecensis  - Kermadec Islands
Erechtites laceratus  - Australia
Erechtites leptanthus  - Chile
Erechtites minimus  - Australia, New Zealand
Erechtites missionum  - South America
Erechtites petiolatus  - South America
Erechtites picridioides  - Australia
Erechtites quadridentatus  - Australia, Java
Erechtites runcinatus  - Mexico
Erechtites scaberulus  - New Zealand
Erechtites sonchoides  - Australia, New Zealand
Erechtites tenuiflorus  - Australia
Erechtites valerianifolius  - Mexico, South America, Central America
Erechtites wairauensis  - New Zealand

Alternatively, a more limited genus circumscription restricts the genus to New World species and only recognises six species in two sections:

 Erechtites sect. Erechtites
 Erechtites hieracifolius 
 Erechtites missionis 
 Erechtites valerianifolius
 Erechtites petiolatus
 Erechtites sect. Goyazenses Belcher 
 Erechtites goyazensis
 Erechtites ignobilis 

The genus name Erechtites is considered masculine by some botanists and feminine by others. Hence some species names may end in "-us" or "-a," for example, Erechtites valerianifolius versus  E. valerianifolia. International Code of Botanical Nomenclature (Art. 62.4) specifies that generic names ending in "-ites" are to be treated as masculine, hence the "-us" ending in such cases is to be preferred over the "-a" ending.

References

External links
USDA Plants Profile

Senecioneae
Asteraceae genera